Anjileh (also Romanized as Anjīleh; also known as Anjila and Hansīleh) is a village in Buin Rural District, Nanur District, Baneh County, Kurdistan Province, Iran. At the 2006 census, its population was 128, in 25 families. The village is populated by Kurds.

References 

Towns and villages in Baneh County
Kurdish settlements in Kurdistan Province